Albert Capraro (May 20, 1943 – October 5, 2013) was an American fashion designer. He graduated from Parsons School of Design and worked for Lilly Daché and Oscar de la Renta for 8 years crafting the boutique collection, before starting his own business in 1974. His clients included Betty Ford, Susan Ford, Barbara Walters, Cristina Ferrare, Polly Bergen, Tawny Little
, Phyllis George and Anne Armstrong.

Capraro died in October 2013, aged 70.

References

1943 births
Living people
American fashion designers
Artists from New York City